Muirchertach Ua Máel Uidir, Bishop of Clonfert, died 1187.

Ua Máel Uidir was Bishop of Clonmacnoise since about 1152. He was made Bishop of Clonfert in 1186, dying in office the following year.

References

Sources
 The Surnames of Ireland, Edward MacLysaght, 1978.
 A New History of Ireland: Volume IX - Maps, Genealogies, Lists, ed. T.W. Moody, F.X. Martin, F.J. Byrne.

External links
 http://www.ucc.ie/celt/published/T100005C/
 http://www.ucc.ie/celt/published/G105007/index.html

People from County Galway
Medieval Gaels from Ireland
12th-century Roman Catholic bishops in Ireland
Bishops of Clonfert
Bishops of Clonmacnoise